William Roberts (20 February 1909 – 7 December 1969) was a Welsh international forward who played club rugby for Oxford University, London Welsh RFC and Cardiff RFC. He won a single cap for Wales in the 1929 Five Nations Championship.

Personal history
Roberts was born in Toxteth, Liverpool in 1909. He was educated at Cardiff High School for Boys before matriculating to Oxford University. In 1934 he married Betty Elliot, daughter of former Wales international Jack Elliot.

He served his country in the Second World War, joining the Welsh Guard as an acting captain. Roberts was a freelance journalist and a breeder of prize Welsh pigs. He died in Bodfari in 1969.

Rugby career
Roberts first came to note as a rugby player while a student representing Cardiff High School. He played for Cardiff RFC while still a teenager, making his first appearance for the club in the 1926–27 season. On entering Oxford he was selected for the Oxford University student team and won four sporting Blues, playing in the Varsity matches of 1928 through to 1931. In the 1929 match he faced his older brother John Roberts, who was playing for Cambridge. In 1931 Roberts was made the secretary of Oxford University RUFC, and for that year's Varsity game he was made captain of the team. Under his captaincy, Oxford won a 'splendid game'. Writing in 1951 Marshall opined that Roberts 'did more than anyone to win the match for Oxford; Roberts weaving and swaying his way in short, powerful strides'.

In 1929 Roberts was selected to play for Wales. This time he was on the same side as his brother, as they faced England in the opening match of the 1929 Five Nations Championship. Roberts played in his preferred fly-half position outside the more experienced Wick Powell. The game ended in an England victory and Roberts was dropped for the next match and didn't represent Wales again. 

Despite a long association with Cardiff RFC, Roberts only played 31 matches for the club. He also played for London Welsh RFC.

International matches played
Wales
  1929

References

Bibliography
 
 
 
 
 

1909 births
1965 deaths
People from Toxteth
Cardiff RFC players
English rugby union players
London Welsh RFC players
Oxford University RFC players
Rugby union centres
Rugby union players from Liverpool
Wales international rugby union players